is a Japanese motorcycle racer set to compete in the 2023 Moto3 World Championship with GasGas Aspar Team.

Career statistics

Grand Prix motorcycle racing

By season

By class

Races by year
(key) (Races in bold indicate pole position, races in italics indicate fastest lap)

References

External links

Japanese motorcycle racers
2001 births
Living people
Moto3 World Championship riders
People from Yotsukaidō